Ashley Leggat (born September 26, 1986) is a Canadian actress. She is known for her roles as Casey McDonald in the Canadian family comedy series Life with Derek and as Tiffany in the MTV television film Made... The Movie.

Early life
Leggat was born in Hamilton, Ontario, and has Scottish and Irish ancestry on her mother's side. Leggat began her theatrical training with Theatre Aquarius's Performing Arts Program under the direction of Lou Zamprogna. That same year, Leggat made her professional theatre debut playing Marta in Theatre Aquarius's production of The Sound of Music. Leggat went on to perform in several of the company's productions, including The Lion, the Witch and the Wardrobe, Cinderella, Anne of Green Gables, Jacob Two-Two Meets the Hooded Fang, Jekyll & Hyde and The Wizard of Oz. She also performed the role of Clara in The Nutcracker at the Hamilton Place Theatre.

Career
Beginning in 2004, she appeared in the Disney feature film Confessions of a Teenage Drama Queen as Marcia, also starring Lindsay Lohan and Megan Fox, the television movie A Very Married Christmas, with Joe Mantegna and Jean Smart and played series lead Kat Adams in Ace Lightning.

Leggat performed concurrent recurring roles on the series I Was a Sixth Grade Alien for Fox and YTV, and In a Heartbeat for the Disney Channel. She performed a guest lead role on the series Real Kids, Real Adventures, and a lead role on the CBC Radio drama Articles of Faith. As well, she appeared in the cable television film What Girls Learn, starring Elizabeth Perkins and Scott Bakula; the Disney television movie The Music Man, starring Matthew Broderick; the comedy series The Blobheads; and the fantasy science-fiction series The Zack Files. In 2005, Leggat performed in Moze Mossanen's short film Roxana as part of CBC's "Opening Night" series.

In 2005, Leggat was cast in the co-lead role of Casey McDonald in the Family Channel family comedy series Life with Derek. The series ran for four seasons before ending its run in 2009. On July 31, 2009, Leggat commented on her official Facebook page that they would begin shooting Vacation with Derek in September of that year; it aired in Canada on the Family Channel in June 2010, and in the U.S. on Starz in 2011.

Leggat starred as Baby in the Toronto version of the play Dirty Dancing in 2008. In 2010, Leggat was cast in MTV's Made... The Movie as the main antagonist, Tiffany. In 2011, Leggat starred as Ashley Dunnfield in the Lifetime television movie The Perfect Roommate. In 2015, she starred in the independent film People Hold On, directed by Life with Derek co-star Michael Seater.

Personal life
Leggat has four older brothers. She is close friends with her Life with Derek co-star Michael Seater. 

In 2011, she married longtime boyfriend, hockey player Jeremy Williams. They have three daughters, born 2017, 2019 and 2022.

Leggat is a supporter of Count Me In, a movement that promotes student volunteerism, and helps connect young people with community service opportunities that match their interests, passions and lifestyle. She hosted the 2012 "Count Me In Conference", which has been recognized as the largest youth-run empowerment event in North America, and again in 2014.

Filmography

References

External links
 
 

1986 births
20th-century Canadian actresses
21st-century Canadian actresses
Actresses from Hamilton, Ontario
Canadian activists
Canadian child actresses
Canadian film actresses
Canadian musical theatre actresses
Canadian people of Irish descent
Canadian people of Scottish descent
Canadian radio actresses
Canadian television actresses
Living people
Musicians from Hamilton, Ontario
Youth activists